King of Fools may refer to:

 Quasimodo, given the honorific "King of Fools" in Disney's 1996 film The Hunchback of Notre Dame
 King of Fools (album), an album by Delirious?
 King of Fools (EP), an EP by Edguy
 "King of Fools", a song by Dwight Yoakam from This Time
 "King of Fools", a song by Social Distortion from Somewhere Between Heaven and Hell
 "King of Fools", a song by IQ from their 1997 album Subterranea
 "King of Fools", a song by Brainstorm from their 1997 album Hungry

See also
Lord of Misrule, a European court figure appointed to preside over the Feast of Fools
Lords of Misrule (disambiguation)